Tiong Bahru Plaza (Simplified Chinese: 中峇鲁广场) is a shopping mall located in Tiong Bahru Estate, in Bukit Merah, Singapore, near Tiong Bahru Road, Jalan Membina and Bukit Ho Swee Crescent, which is where the entrance to the mall is located. It consists of a 20-storey office tower block (Central Plaza), and a 6-storey shopping and entertainment complex, with 3 basement carparks. The mall is also directly linked to Tiong Bahru MRT Station of the East West Line, which is easily accessible from Exit B of the station.

The suburban mall has a total of 167 shops spread around 6 floors. The mall has most of the essential shops and provides most of the services and products needed by the people in the area. It has recently been upgraded and the renovations have made the mall better.

History
Developed by UOL Limited, Tiong Bahru Plaza and the adjacent office tower, Central Plaza was completed in late 1994 as the first shopping mall in Tiong Bahru and Bukit Merah. Like a typical suburban mall at that time, it had a cinema, a department store, a supermarket, a food court, and more than 100 specialty shops.

In 2003, the mall was sold to ARMF Pte Ltd.

The mall commenced renovation works in 2005, such as converting the entire Basement 1 carpark into retail space and connecting it to the MRT station beside it. In addition, the tenant mix was refreshed as well.

In 2015, Tiong Bahru Plaza underwent a major revamp costing $90 million, changing the external facade, increasing retail space and connecting the mall to the office tower. In August 2015, the mall shut its doors for extensive renovation works and reopened in March 2016. It also added a new playground on the 3rd floor, an updated tenant mix with new retail concepts on all floors, these include Golden Village, Uniqlo, Rubi Shoes and Miniso. An outdoor plaza for events was also created on the ground floor of the mall. In 2017, the mall’s digital directories were affected by ransomware attacks, just before the NETS breakdown on 5 February 2018.

Currently, JYSK and Rubi Shoes were similarly replaced by Sushiro and Daiso in the forthcoming 2019 year. Sushiro had opened the first store at Tiong Bahru Plaza on 19 August 2019.

References

External links
 

Shopping malls in Singapore
Bukit Merah